Barara Buzurg is a village in Dalmau block of Rae Bareli district, Uttar Pradesh, India. As of 2011, it has a population of 5,685 people, in 1,031 households. It has 4 primary schools and 1 maternity and child welfare centre. It hosts a market twice per week, on Mondays and Fridays; cattle, cloth, and vegetables are the main items traded.

The 1961 census recorded Barara Buzurg as comprising 16 hamlets, with a total population of 2,441 people (1,241 male and 1,200 female), in 483 households and 443 physical houses. The area of the village was given as 1,904 acres and it had a pot office and a medical practitioner at that point. Average attendance for the twice-weekly market was about 150 people.

The 1981 census recorded Barara Buzurg as having a population of 3,424 people, in 619 households, and having an area of 779.52 hectares. The main staple foods were listed as wheat and rice.

References

Villages in Raebareli district